Farrukh Beg (Persian: فرخ بیگ) (ca. 1547), also known as Farrukh Husayn, was a Persian miniature painter, who spent a bulk of his career in Safavid Iran and Mughal India, praised by Mughal Emperor Jahangir as “unrivaled in the age.”

Farrukh Beg was credited with painting a plethora of Persian and Mughal paintings, a handful of which survive today. His work showed his distinct training in Persian manuscript painting, which later on evolved to include more experimental techniques such as atmospheric perspective and modeling. Beg had produced miniature paintings under the patronage of five known rulers in West Asia and South Asia: Ibrahim Mirza of Safavid Mashhad, Mirza Muhammad Hakim of Kabul, Akbar in Mughal India and later his son Jahangir, and Ibrahim Adil Shah II of the Sultanate of Bijapur. His distinct style came to be revered by his contemporaries and patrons, due to a distinct homogeneity, evolving as a result of his Persian training and experiences in cosmopolitan Mughal courts. His life was later mired in mystery due to his sudden hiatus from the Mughal court sometime after 1595, rejoining the Mughal atelier around 1609. Evidence has shown he spent a bulk of this time in Bijapur under the patronage of Ibrahim Adil Shah II of the Sultanate of Bijapur.

Life in Safavid Iran and Kabul 
Beg was born in modern-day Iran, around 1547. He belonged to the Kalmaq tribe, according to Akbar's vizier Abu'l Fazl, while some sources contest that he originated from the Qashqa’i tribe. He received his training in Khurasan (located in modern-day northwest Iran). The earliest mention of Beg appears in a historical record by Iskander Beg Munshi, a court historian under Shah Abbas I, about the close companionship between Farrukh Beg and his brother Siyavush and Hamza Mirza, son of the reigning Safavid ruler, Shah Muhammad Khodabanda. While working at the atelier of Ibrahim Mirza, the governor of Mashhad, Farrukh Beg illustrated a manuscript of Haft Awrang (Seven Thrones). Beg illustrated all but one painting in the manuscript, allowing him to form a homogenous iconographic style as reflected in the artwork. Farrukh Beg's early tutelage is indirectly attributed to Mirza Ali and Shaykh Muhammad, two prolific painters who belonged to the atelier of Ibrahim Mirza in Mashhad. However, no direct link has been established between the latter painters and Beg.

While the exact date of Beg's departure for Kabul is not recorded, his tenure under Mirza Muhammad Hakim, half-brother of Mughal Emperor Akbar, has been well documented. While the extent of Beg's work for Muhammad Hakim is difficult to gauge due to a lack of illustrations available, two tinted illustrations made under Hakim bear Beg's signature, housed in the Gulistan Palace Library in Tehran, Iran. In 1585 at the age of 40, after the death of Mirza Muhammad Hakim, he took his skills to the court of Mughal Emperor Akbar in Mughal India, either in Rawalpindi or Lahore.

Work at the Mughal Court under Akbar 

Beg's arrival at Mughal court is documented by Abu'l Fazl in the administrative record, Ain-i-Akbari. Abu'l Fazl states "Farrukh Beg Musavvir and others received suitable robes and horses, and trays of muhrs and rupis. Various favors were conferred upon them." Beg's first illustration in Akbar's atelier was the Khamsa of Nizami, a Persian manuscript in which Beg embellished seven out of thirty-six illustrations. The composition and stylistic techniques of the Khamsaillustrations draw heavily from his previous work, Haft Awrang, under Safavid patronage.

He worked on the Baburnama and the Akbarnama, both commissioned by Akbar as historical documentation of Babur and Akbar's reign. In the Akbarnama, some of Beg's works include Akbar's Triumphal Entry into Surat and Mir Mu’izz al-Mulk and Afghan rebel Bahadur Khan meet in 1567. Beg's work in the Baburnama includes the illustration titled Babur Entertains in Sultan Imrahim Lodi’s Palace. 

Working in the Mughal atelier, Beg was often singled out as one of the most exceptional manuscript painters of his time, along with the other renowned Mughal painters like Daswant and La’l. Farrukh Beg's celebrated status at Akbar's court is seen through frequent mentions as "nadir al-asr" (Wonder of the age) in Baburnama and Akbarnama, conferred as part of the reward system instituted by Mughal rulers to exalt artists' workmanship.

Hiatus from Mughal Court and Later Return 
In around 1590, Beg took a brief leave from the Mughal court of Akbar. In 1957, scholar Robert Skelton proposed that Beg spent his sojourn in the Sultanate of Bijapur under the patronage of Ibrahim Adil Shah II, a theory highly contested by scholars until evidence unearthed by art historians John Seyller and Ellen Smart confirmed this hypothesis. The scholars ascertained a signature by Beg on a Deccan illustration titled Ibrahim Adil II Hawking (1598), translated as "it is the work of Farrukh Beg" (aml-i Farrukh Beg ast). The signature helped identify more paintings completed at the hand of Beg in the Sultanate of Bijapur, based on starkly similar stylistic choices and compositional renderings. Many of his illustrations at the Deccan court bear the name Farrukh Husayn. Other paintings by Beg during this period include Ibrahim Adil Shah plays the Lute (1600), Ibrahim Rides the Elephant Atish Khan, Bull Elephant (1600-1604) and Horse and Groom (1604).

Around 1609, Beg returned to the Mughal Court, now under the rule of Emperor Jahangir. His return is dated by a mention in Jahangir's memoirs, which report Jahangir bestowing 2,000 rupees on the “unrivaled” Farrukh Beg. Under the auspices of Jahangir, Beg worked on the Gulshan Muraqqa, an album of illustrations assembled by Jahangir, as well as the Minto Album. He also painted several folios, now separated from their original work and dispersed among collections around the world. The latest mention of Beg occurs in Iqbalnama-i Jahangiri, penned by Mutamad Khan, celebrating Beg's artistic ingenuity and creativity by referring to him as "who has no rival or equal in the space of the universe."

Style and Technique 
Throughout his career, Beg leveraged his interaction with various geographical locations across West Asia and cosmopolitan courts in South Asia, artistic styles and patrons to hone his own artistic technique. Beg's early style is marked by similarity to Persian painting lexicon developed under Safavid rule, particularly by Mirza Ali and Shaykh Muhammad, which he practiced under Safavid patronage before arriving to Mughal India. Individualized figural portraits, geometric patterns in landscape and clothing, and planar treatment of architecture were widespread in his illustrations. His first documented illustrations in the Haft Awrang juxtapose bright colors to enhance the didactic and literary work with unique figural traits shown using elongated facial features and chin positions.

In his illustrations at Mughal court, Beg imported his artistic techniques, informed by his work in Safavid Iran. As illustrated in Akbar's Triumphal Entry into Surat, Beg continued the use of color to simultaneously separate and harmonize the composition, while displaying patterned and minutely detailed architectural background, geometric forms contrasted with serpentine chenar trees, illuminated gold skies and intricate vegetal surroundings with bent and textured foliage. His revered position at the Mughal court enabled him to imbue his own creative genius into his work, due to a special dispensation allowing him to work alone on all illustrations between 1586 and 1596. He fully utilized these techniques in Mughal miniature paintings but later went on to incorporate atmospheric perspective, figural modeling and folding drapery in his paintings, primarily seen after his Bijapur period, as illustrated in the painting of the Old Sufi.

A recurrent theme in Beg's work was renderings of youths and Sufis. Beg painted many illustrations of adorable youths and princes and aged and esteemed Sufi figures, particularly after his return to the Mughal court under Jahangir. He conducted extensive study to paint these figures, portraying them in solitude and immersed in natural surroundings, emphasizing their spirituality. The opulently dressed youths and simply dressed Sufis stand in impassive poses, holding an inanimate object or flowers and birds as witness of religious elation and spiritual connection.

References

1545 births
1615 deaths
Persian miniature painters
16th-century Indian painters
Mughal painters
16th-century Iranian painters
17th-century Iranian painters